This article provides details of international football games played by the Singapore national football team from 1948 to 1969.

Results

1948

1950

1953

1954

1956

1957

1958

1959

1960

1961

1962

1963

1964

1965

1966

1967

1968

1969

References

Football in Singapore
Results 1948
1940s in Singaporean sport
1950s in Singaporean sport
1960s in Singaporean sport